Abubakar Salim (born 7 January 1993) is a British actor. For his work on Assassin's Creed Origins, he was nominated for a British Academy Games Award and named a BAFTA Breakthrough Brit. On television, he is known for his roles in the Sky One series Jamestown (2018–2019) and the HBO Max series Raised by Wolves (2020–2022).

Early life
Born in Welwyn Garden City, Hertfordshire, Salim is a first-generation Briton of Kenyan descent. His father was a software engineer for Xerox, and his mother a carer. He began his acting career at age 16 when he joined the National Youth Theatre after his first audition. He subsequently received scholarships to further his career.

Acting and video game career
Perhaps his most notable acting role is Father in the streaming series Raised by Wolves. Salim had a voice-role as the protagonist in the 2017 video game Assassin's Creed Origins. The role garnered him a BAFTA nomination. Salim also portrayed Pedro in the British TV series Jamestown. He is also the founder and CEO of Silver Rain Games. A self-described fan of video games, Salim noted that his work for Origins gave him a better insight into the development process for video games, which eventually inspired him to pursue a career in video game development and establish his own studio.

Personal life
Salim married Lottie Wright at Hackney Town Hall in May 2022. They have a daughter.

Filmography

References

External links
Abubakar Salim on IMDb
Abubakar Salim on TV Guide

Living people
1993 births
21st-century British male actors
Black British male actors
British male film actors
British male television actors
British male video game actors
British male voice actors
British people of Kenyan descent
National Youth Theatre members
Male actors from Hertfordshire
People from Welwyn Garden City
Video game developers